Lindsay Davenport and Martina Navratilova were the defending champions, but lost to Tracy Austin and Kim Clijsters in the final, 3–6, 6–3, [5–10].

Draw

Final

Group A
Standings are determined by: 1. number of wins; 2. number of matches; 3. in three-players-ties, percentage of sets won, or of games won; 4. steering-committee decision.

Group B
Standings are determined by: 1. number of wins; 2. number of matches; 3. in three-players-ties, percentage of sets won, or of games won; 4. steering-committee decision.

References
Main Draw

Women's Legends Doubles